Elmgrove Primary School (Sometimes referred to as simply Elmgrove and originally known as Elmgrove Elementary School) is a state-controlled Primary School situated in East Belfast, Northern Ireland. It opened in 1932 as Elmgrove Elementary School. In 2008 Elmgrove celebrated its 75th anniversary. Special medals made from Mambco, were given to all the pupils. Special balloons were also present and two students from each year group got a balloon and released it into the air with a note attached saying that, when found, contact the school, to see how far the balloon travelled. The farthest known distance was to Scotland.

History
Elmgrove opened in 1932/3 as Elmgrove Elementary School. Pupils from nearby schools were all moved into Elmgrove. Several famous/well-known people from Belfast attended the school. In 2008 Peter Robinson visited the school and several P7 pupils got to ask him questions about his childhood and career. In 2009 Henry Winkler (The Fonz) visited the school to talk about reading books and his new book. During Elections, the school is used as a polling station.

2012 Bomb scares

12 March
On 12 March 2012, a pipe bomb was left yards from the school gates in the street opposite, Flora Street. Homes around the area were evacuated and so was Elmgrove and nearby Avoniel Primary School, due to the close proximity of the bomb.

13 March
On 13 March 2012, another pipe bomb was found in the area, near the Conn O'Neill bridge on the opposite side of the road where the other bomb had been found the day before.

2015 malicious threat
On 21 January 2015, an e-mail was sent to the school which prompted the school to close on 23 January for the safety of those working and attending the school. However, despite the fact the threat was reported to the PSNI on Wednesday, the public had not been notified until Thursday evening. Throughout the evening and night of 22 January, police patrols were set up in the area. Police stated they were working with the Garda Síochána. Later on that night a 33-year-old man was arrested under suspicion of sending 'malicious telecommunications'.

Principals
John Sullivan 1932–1948
Arthur Clemitson 1948–1972
Dr Jim Hunter 1972-1995/1996
Frazer Thompson 1995/1996-2000
David Hutchinson 2000–2011 (his death, 11 August 2011)
Andrea Brown 2011–2013 (Acting)
Jayne Jeffers April 2013 – present

Former pupils
Billy Bingham, footballer
Van Morrison, musician
Sammy Wilson, politician
Ian Paisley Junior, politician

Projects

Out of this World
In 2006, pupils from Elmgrove took part in a new CCEA teaching resource called Out of this World. They were joined with St. Teresa's Primary School for the activity. Pupils made different objects with recycled materials.

Connswater Community Greenway Project
Elmgrove has been involved with the local project to refurbish the local walkway and river next to the school. Over the years, the Conn O'Neill bridge and river nearby has been vandalised. The school has represented the project several times, first on 14 November 2007 and the second on 24 October 2008.

Over the Halfpenny Bridge
In 2009, Elmgrove stated that a new production was in the works with Dance United NI. The show was later named Over the Halfpenny Bridge. It was about the History of Belfast and starred the P7 pupils of that year, and Elderly members from nearby nursing homes, Elmgrove Manor and Greenville Court. 'I am staggered by the range and the quality of what has been produced this evening,' said school principal David Hutchinson. 'The children have acquired so many new skills by working with this terrific company and, through them, all of our minds have been opened.' The children worked with Writer Ruth Carr, Rastafarian poet Levi Tafari, printmaker Robin Cordiner, musicians Nikki Such, Patrick and Bronagh Davey and Irish, Greek and Indian dancers. On 2 April 2009, the show was performed live in St George's Market, Belfast.

Eco-Schools Programme
Since 2009, the school has taken part in an Eco programme to make the school more eco-friendly. The School has Recently won the Green Flag Award

Sesame Tree
In 2010, P2 pupils from the school starred in a T.V series that aired on CBeebies called Sesame Tree, Northern Ireland's version of Sesame Street.

References

Primary schools in Belfast
Grade B+ listed buildings
Van Morrison